Elliottville, Kentucky is an unincorporated community hamlet in Rowan County, Kentucky, east of Morehead. The Zip Code is: 40317. The elevation is just under 1000 feet. Elliottville appears on the Haldeman, Kentucky U.S. Geological Survey Map.

Notes
 

Unincorporated communities in Kentucky
Unincorporated communities in Rowan County, Kentucky